Schmiedel is a German surname. Notable people with the surname include:

Oskar Schmiedel (1887–1959), pharmacist, anthroposophist, therapist, Goethean scientist and theosophist
Paul Wilhelm Schmiedel (1851–1935), German theologian
Paulina Schmiedel (born 1993), German swimmer

See also 

Schmidl
Dovid Schmidel
Friedrich Schmiedl

German-language surnames

de:Schmiedel
he:שמידל